Cristian Egídio da Rosa (born 4 September 1987) is a Brazilian racing cyclist, who currently rides for UCI Continental team . He rode at the 2014 UCI Road World Championships.

Major results

2009
 National Under-23 Road Championships
1st  Road race
3rd Time trial
2010
 1st Stage 4 Tour de Santa Catarina
 8th Overall Tour do Rio
2012
 Tour do Brasil
1st Mountains classification
1st Stage 5
2013
 1st Overall Vuelta del Uruguay
2014
 8th Time trial, Pan American Road Championships
2015
 3rd Copa América de Ciclismo
 9th Road race, Pan American Road Championships
2016
 8th Overall Vuelta del Uruguay
2017
 1st Mountains classification Vuelta del Uruguay
 2nd Time trial, National Road Championships
2018
 1st Stage 3 Vuelta del Uruguay
 2nd Time trial, National Road Championships
 10th Time trial, Pan American Road Championships
2019
 2nd Time trial, National Road Championships
 2nd Overall Vuelta del Uruguay
2021
 National Road Championships
2nd Time trial
3rd Road race
 7th Time trial, Pan American Road Championships
2022
 5th Overall Vuelta a Formosa Internacional

References

External links

1987 births
Living people
Brazilian male cyclists
Brazilian road racing cyclists
Cyclists at the 2015 Pan American Games
Pan American Games competitors for Brazil
People from Arapongas
Sportspeople from Paraná (state)
20th-century Brazilian people
21st-century Brazilian people